Sitona is a large genus of weevils in the family Curculionidae native to the Nearctic and Palaearctic regions. Over 100 species have been described. Sitona is easily distinguished from related genera by flat, recumbent scales on the mandibles, by the absence of an oval scar on the mandibles, by short and broad rostrum with a deep, longitudinal, median groove, and by dense scales on the body.

Sitona specialize on legumes, plants of the family Fabaceae. The larvae eat the root nodules and the adults eat the leaves. Several species of Sitona are important agricultural pests of legumes, especially in its native regions and introduced populations in South Africa, Australia and New Zealand.

Species include:
Sitona aliceae
Sitona aquilonius
Sitona bicolor
Sitona brucki
Sitona californius
Sitona concavirostris
Sitona crinitus
Sitona cylindricollis
Sitona demoflysi
Sitona desertus
Sitona discoideus Gyllenhal
Sitona fairmairei Allard, 1869
Sitona flavescens
Sitona fronto
Sitona hispidulus 
Sitona lepidus Gyllenhal – clover root weevil
Sitona lineatus – pea leaf weevil
Sitona lineellus
Sitona maroccanus
Sitona planifrons
Sitona puncticollis
Sitona sulcifrons
Sitona syriacus
Sitona tanneri
Sitona vittatus
Sitona volkovitshi
Sitona wahrmani

References 

Entiminae
Curculionidae genera